Bembidiomorphum is a genus of ground beetles in the family Carabidae. There are two described species in Bembidiomorphum, found in Chile.

Species
These two species belong to the genus Bembidiomorphum:
 Bembidiomorphum convexum Champion, 1918
 Bembidiomorphum silvicola (Roig-Juñent, 2000)

References

External links
 Notes on various South American coleoptera collected by Charles Darwin

Broscini
Monotypic Carabidae genera